Lithophaga nigra, or the Black date mussel, is a species of bivalve mollusc in the family Mytilidae. It can be found along the Atlantic coast of North America, ranging from southern Florida to the West Indies.

References

nigra
Bivalves described in 1842